Khair ad-Din, Arabic name meaning "the goodness of the faith",  may refer to:

Hayreddin Pasha (1330-1387), Ottoman grand vizier
Jam Khairuddin also known as Jam Tamachi (1367–1379), Sultan of Samma Dynasty
Hayreddin Barbarossa (1478–1546), Barbary corsair and Ottoman admiral
Khayr al-Din al-Ramli, (1585–1671) 17th-century Islamic jurist, teacher and writer 
Hayreddin Pasha (c. 1822–1890), Tunisian political reformer and Ottoman Grand Vizier (sometimes known as "Khair al-Din" or "Khaireddin")
Kheireddine Abdul Wahab (1878–1944), Lebanese businessman and politician
Khayreddin al-Ahdab (1894–1941), Lebanese politician
Muhammad Khair ud-din Mirza, Khurshid Jah Bahadur (1914–1975), titular Emperor of the Mughal Empire
Khairuddin Mohamed Yusof (born 1939), medical professor at the University of Malaya
Mohammed Khaïr-Eddine (born 1941), Moroccan writer
Hajrudin Varešanović, known as Hari Varešanović (born 1961), Bosnian singer
Kheireddine Kherris (born 1973), Algerian footballer
Kheireddine Zarabi (born 1984), Algerian footballer
Tasha Kheiriddin, (born 1970), Canadian political commentator

See also 
Hayredin, village in Bulgaria
Hayrettin (disambiguation)
Kheïr Eddine District, Algeria
Haradinaj, Albanian surname
Hajradinović, Bosnian surname

Arabic masculine given names